Ryka Aoki is an American author of novels, poetry, and essays. She teaches English at Santa Monica College and gender studies at Antioch University.

Her work includes the poetry collections Seasonal Velocities and Why Dust Shall Never Settle Upon This Soul along with the novels  and Light From Uncommon Stars. Seasonal Velocities was a finalist for the award for transgender nonfiction in the 25th Lambda Literary Awards in 2013. Her poetry Why Dust Shall Never Settle Upon This Soul was a finalist for the 28th Lambda Literary Awards in 2016. Light From Uncommon Stars was nominated for a 2022 Hugo Award for Best Novel.

Biography 
Aoki earned her Master of Fine Arts degree in creative writing from Cornell University, and won the Academy of American Poets' University Award. She was honored by the California State Senate for her work with Trans/Giving, a Los Angeles performance series for trans and genderqueer individuals.

Aoki, a trans woman, has said that she strives not to write just for other trans readers, but for their family, and other people in general. Her book  was meant to chronicle the common Hawaiian experience. In addition to her book, Aoki also wrote a piece for Publishers Weekly. She hopes that through writing for a general audience instead of only trans people, that she can help others see transgender people as human, she wrote: "If a trans musician can make the audience cry by playing Chopin, how else, but as a human, can she be regarded? And if a book written by a queer trans Asian American can make you think of your own beaches, your own sunsets, or the dear departed grandmother you loved so much and even now find yourself speaking to, then what more powerful statement of our common humanity can there be?"

An interview with Aoki was featured in the 2014 book Queer and Trans Artists of Color: Stories of Some of Our Lives, by Nia King, which was named one of The Advocates Best Transgender Non-Fiction Books of 2014. Aoki toured with the Tranny Roadshow and the Fully Functional Cabaret, creating visible performance space for trans people across the country.

In 2021, she released Light from Uncommon Stars. She has described the book as being in part influenced by the story of Ted Ngoy, the Cambodian American entrepreneur known as the "Donut King", stating that she wanted "to open my own literary donut shop". Kirkus Reviews described the book as "filled with mouthwatering descriptions of food and heart-swelling meditations on music". Writing for Tor.com, Maya Gittelman described Light from Uncommon Stars as "often a joy to read ... also often painful to read", and being "written with profound catharsis, forgiveness when it’s due, and so, so much hope"; likewise, Alana Joli Abbott described the book as "an incredibly powerful story of hope and redemption" for Den of Geek.

Personal life 
Aoki holds a black belt and has been head judo coach at both Cornell University and UCLA.

Bibliography
 Seasonal Velocities, Ryka Aoki, 2012, 
 , Topside Press, 2014, 
 Why Dust Shall Never Settle Upon This Soul, biyuti publishing, 2015, 
 Light From Uncommon Stars, Tor Books, 2021,

References

Further reading

External links 
 
  
  
 

American writers of Japanese descent
American women poets
American poets of Asian descent
American women novelists
American novelists of Asian descent
21st-century American poets
21st-century American novelists
Transgender women
Transgender novelists
Living people
Writers from Los Angeles
Cornell University alumni
21st-century American women writers
American LGBT people of Asian descent
LGBT people from California
Year of birth missing (living people)
Transgender academics
American women writers of Asian descent
American transgender writers